is a neighborhood in Toshima, Tokyo, Japan. It is located among JR Ikebukuro, Ōtsuka, and Itabashi Stations and spread along Meiji Avenue.

Kami-ikebukuro borders Ikebukuro-honchō, Takinogawa (in Kita), and Nishi-sugamo in the north, and Kita-Ōtsuka and Higashi-ikebukuro in the south. Most of it is a residential area that is formed after World War 2, and some parts along Meiji Avenue are commercial.

Geography 
The south end of the area is edge of Ikebukuro tableland with an altitude of about 30 meters. Conversely, the north side of the area faces the Yabata River, with relatively low altitude of about 20 meters.

History 
 Kamakura period: Kamakura-kaido that runs through this area, had been established by the Kamakura shogunate.
 Before the Edo period: This area is believed to have been mostly forest, woods, with some farms, because Kami-ikebukuro was outside of the Edo metropolitan area from which the Tokugawa shogunate had ruled.

Transportation 
Roads
Meiji Avenue
Ganken street
Kawagoe Road
Route 5 (Shuto Expressway) (Takebashi Junction- Bijogi Junction)
Railways
JR Yamanote Line
JR Akabane Line (Saikyō Line)
Tōbu Tōjō Line
Buses
Bus services run on Meiji-dori Avenue.
Services
KUSA63 (草63) service (To Asakusa via Ōji Station)
KUSA64 (草64) service (To Asakusa via Nishi-Nippori Station)
OH40 (王40) service (To Ōji Station, Nishiarai Station)
Bus stops
Kami-ikebukuro 1-chōme
Kami-ikebukuro 3-chōme
Kami-ikebukuro 4-chōme

Significant facilities 
Itabashi Station
Ikebukuro Community Center
Ikebukuro Sports Center
APA Hotel Tokyo Itabashi

Show places 
Ocha-agare-jizō
Ikebukuro-Ōhashi overpass

Parks 
Kami-ikebukuro Central Park
Miyanaka Park
Kami-ikebukuro Park
Kami-ikebukuro Sakura (cherry blossom) Park
Horinouchi Park

Shops 
Supermarkets
Sundaymart supermarket
Convenience stores
Seven-Eleven (2-chōme, 3-chōme)
Family Mart (3-chōme, 4-chōme)
Lawson (1-chōme)
Ministop( 1-chōme, 4-chōme)
99 Shop
Y Shop Homareya

Restaurants 
Kami-ikebukuro Chūkarō (Chinese)
Daifuku (Chinese)
Cafe Tablier (French)
Wakamatsu (Japanese, oden)

Financial institutions 
Nihon-yūsei-kōsha (Japan Post)

Educational facilities 
 Sugamo Gakuen (high school/junior high school)
 Ikebukuro-daiichi Primary School

Neighborhoods of Tokyo
Districts of Toshima